Navia splendens is a plant species in the genus Navia. This species is native to Venezuela and Guyana.

References

splendens
Flora of Venezuela
Flora of Guyana
Plants described in 1964